Raja University(RU) (Danushgah-e Reja´) is a private university based in Qazvin, Iran. The university operates in accordance with the objectives of the High Council of Educational Revelation,  Ministry of Science, Research and Technology.  The center has 5000 students. It is located in an area of about 72,000 square meters to the northwest of Qazvin City (Imam Khomeini Boulevard).

Fields of study
  Technical & Engineering
  Financial Management & Engineering
  Accounting
  Management
  Economics

See also

 List of Iranian Research Centers
 Higher education in Iran
 Darolfonoon
 List of Iranian scientists from the pre-modern era.
 Modern Iranian scientists and engineers
 Education in Iran
 National Library of Iran

References

http://raja.ac.ir/index.aspx

External links
Official website

Universities in Iran
Educational institutions established in 1995
Education in Qazvin Province
Buildings and structures in Qazvin Province
1995 establishments in Iran